Robert Louis Leggett (July 26, 1926 – August 13, 1997) was an American lawyer and politician who served eight terms as a U.S. Representative from California from 1963 to 1979.

Early life 

Born in Richmond, California, Leggett attended the public schools there. He served as an enlisted man in the United States Naval Air Corps from 1944 to 1946.

He graduated from the University of California, Berkeley with a B.A. in 1947, and the University of California's Boalt Hall School of Jurisprudence with a J.D. in 1950. He was admitted to the bar in 1951 and began the practice of law in Vallejo, California. He served as member of the California State Assembly in 1960 and 1962.

Congressional career 

Leggett was elected as a Democrat to the Eighty-eighth and to the seven succeeding Congresses, serving from January 3, 1963, to January 3, 1979. He served on the House Armed Services Committee and opposed the Vietnam War.  He also was an early environmentalist.

In the 1970s, he began an affair with Suzi Park Thomson, an aide to Speaker of the House Carl Albert. Thomson, who was born in Korea, frequently entertained diplomats and intelligence officials from the South Korean Embassy. In 1976, as part of investigations related to Koreagate, the Federal Bureau of Investigation and Internal Revenue Service contended that Leggett may have passed information to Korean officials or received favors from them. Leggett strongly denied the accusations and retired from Congress in 1979. He and Thomson married in 1981.

Leggett died August 13, 1997, in Orange, California, aged 71.

See also
List of federal political sex scandals in the United States

References

External links
Join California Robert L. Leggett

1926 births
1997 deaths
Politicians from Richmond, California
Democratic Party members of the United States House of Representatives from California
California lawyers
University of California, Berkeley alumni
People from Orange, California
United States Navy personnel of World War II
United States Navy sailors
UC Berkeley School of Law alumni
20th-century American politicians
Politicians from Vallejo, California
Military personnel from Vallejo, California
20th-century American lawyers
Democratic Party members of the California State Assembly